Siwat Matangkapong (born 10 March 1994) is a Thai swimmer. He competed in the men's 100 metre butterfly event at the 2018 FINA World Swimming Championships (25 m), in Hangzhou, China.

References

1994 births
Living people
Siwat Matangkapong
Male butterfly swimmers
Place of birth missing (living people)
Siwat Matangkapong